Personal Effects is a 2008 romantic drama film directed by David Hollander and starring Michelle Pfeiffer, Ashton Kutcher and Kathy Bates. It is based on the short story "Mansion on the Hill" from Rick Moody's book Demonology. The film premiered in Iowa City on December 12, 2008, as part of a fundraiser for Iowa Flood Relief. The DVD was released on May 12, 2009.

The film was filmed in the Vancouver, British Columbia, area.

Synopsis
Walter is a young wrestler trying to deal with the brutal death of his sister. He returns home to help his mother Gloria and niece. After getting a dead-end job at Mega Burger as a chicken (wearing a yellow chicken suit) who stands outside and offers samples to passing pedestrians, he meets Linda, a beautiful older woman who is a widow and works as a wedding planner. Her alcoholic husband was murdered by his friend in a bar and she has a deaf and mute son named Clay, who misses his father and has repressed anger towards the killer. As both Linda and Walter try to cope with the pain and frustration of their loss, the two bond—their shared tragedies spawning an unlikely and beautiful romance. Walter befriends Clay and gets him into wrestling.

Cast

Main Cast 
 Michelle Pfeiffer as Linda.
 Ashton Kutcher as Walter
 Kathy Bates as Gloria
 Spencer Hudson as Clay
 John Mann as Hank
 David Lewis as Brice
 Rob LaBelle as Camden
 Sarah Lind as Annie
 Jay Brazeau as Martin
 Brian Markinson as Finneran.
 Jennifer Chan as Grace.

Additional cast 
 Topher Grace as Clay (voice).

Release 
In March 2009, it was released in United States.

References

 "Famous Iowans Helping Flood Relief", 13WHO TV.com. Retrieved January 26, 2009.
 "Johnson, Kutcher to headline flood relief events", www.press-citizen.com. Retrieved January 26, 2009.
 "Ashton Kutcher in Iowa to headline relief efforts", Chicago Tribune. Retrieved January 26, 2009.

External links
 
 
 

2008 films
2008 independent films
2008 romantic drama films
2000s sports drama films
American independent films
American romantic drama films
American sports drama films
Canadian independent films
Canadian romantic drama films
Canadian sports drama films
English-language Canadian films
English-language German films
Films based on short fiction
Films shot in Vancouver
German independent films
German romantic drama films
German sports drama films
Sport wrestling films
2000s English-language films
2000s American films
2000s Canadian films
2000s German films